Peter la Chapman (fl. 1306) was an English politician.

He was a Member (MP) of the Parliament of England for Derby in 1306.

References

13th-century births
14th-century deaths
English MPs 1306